Joseph-Berlioz Randriamihaja (born 30 November 1975) is a Malagasy athlete who specializes in the 110 metres hurdles. In his early career he competed in decathlon. He is the current Malagasy record holder in hurdles and former record holder in decathlon.

Competition record

References

External links

1975 births
Living people
Malagasy male hurdlers
Athletes (track and field) at the 2000 Summer Olympics
Athletes (track and field) at the 2004 Summer Olympics
Athletes (track and field) at the 2008 Summer Olympics
Olympic athletes of Madagascar
World Athletics Championships athletes for Ivory Coast
African Games gold medalists for Madagascar
African Games medalists in athletics (track and field)
African Games silver medalists for Madagascar
Athletes (track and field) at the 1999 All-Africa Games
Athletes (track and field) at the 2003 All-Africa Games
Athletes (track and field) at the 2007 All-Africa Games